Weston High School is a secondary school located near the town of Cazenovia, Richland County, Wisconsin.  The school also serves the villages of Hillpoint, Lime Ridge, and other parts of western Sauk County, Wisconsin.  The Silver Eagles wear Columbia Blue and Silver and compete in the Ridge & Valley Conference.

Weston High School is the site of a school shooting that occurred on September 29, 2006, that left principal John Klang dead after sustaining critical wounds. Melissa Nigh was appointed principal after Klang's death.

See also
Weston High School shooting

References

External links 
 

Public high schools in Wisconsin
Schools in Richland County, Wisconsin
Education in Sauk County, Wisconsin